Morgana may refer to:

People 
 Morgana Gmach (born 1994), Brazilian female rhythmic gymnast
 Morgana King (1930–2018), American singer and actress
 Morgana O'Reilly (born 1985), New Zealand actress
 Morgana Robinson (born 1982), British comedian
 Nina Morgana (1891–1986), Italian-American soprano

Fictional characters
 Morgana, an alternative name of Morgan le Fay, a sorceress in the Arthurian legend (a version popular in many modern adaptations)
 Morgana (comics), a DC comics character
 Morgana (The Little Mermaid), a villain of the film The Little Mermaid II: Return to the Sea
 Morgana (Jewel Riders), second season character in Jewel Riders
 Morgana (One Thousand and One Nights), a clever slave-girl from the tale "Ali Baba and the Forty Thieves"
 Morgana (Power Rangers), a villain from Power Rangers: S.P.D. 
 Morgana Macawber, a Darkwing Duck character 
 Morgana, a character from the video game Persona 5
 Morgana, a champion in the League of Legends video game
 Morgana (Merlin character), a character in Merlin
 Morgana le Fay, a character in the video game Trollhunters: Tales of Arcadia
 Morgana, character in the Netflix series Cursed
 Morgana, character in the video game The House in Fata Morgana

Other uses
 Morgana (documentary), a 2019 Australian film about pornographic film star Morgana Muses
 "Morgana" (Jewel Riders episode), episode in Princess Gwenevere and the Jewel Riders
 The Morgana Show, a British television sketch comedy
 Teatro Morgana, former name of Teatro Brancaccio
 Morgana, a 2012 Mexican film

See also 
 Fata Morgana (disambiguation)
 
 Morganna (disambiguation)
 Morgan le Fay (disambiguation)
 Morgaine (disambiguation)
 Morgan (disambiguation)